Pecking Order  is a card game, where players try to claim the best feeding spots in the jungle by playing their birds on the perches and determining who is stronger. It was published by Winning Moves Games USA in 2006 as the first game in its now discontinued Immortal Eyes line.

Gameplay 
The game is typically played over a number of rounds, decided in advance by the players.  Players start the game by placing the board between them showing all the perches.  Each player shuffles a set of cards (birds featuring the numbers 1-12 and a Jaguar) to create their deck.  On a player's turn, they draw a card and place it on one of the perches face-down.  If the opposing player already has a card on that perch, a battle occurs, with the player playing the card being of aggressor.  The defender flips over their card and the result is determined by the aggressor (whose card is still face down:

1) If both played birds, the player with the higher numbered bird wins.

2) If either played the Jaguar, that player who played it wins unless both players played jaguars, in which case there is a tie.

3) If it is a tie, the player controlling the 1 point (Tie-breaker) perch is the winner.

If neither player controls the tie-breaker perch, then the tie goes to the aggressor. The losing card is removed, along with any jaguars.  There are certain perches that allow for special abilities or extra points.  The 1 point perch is a Tie-breaker perch, allowing the controlling player to win ties.  The 3 point perch is the Vision Roof and it allows a player who wins the perch to look at a face down card of an opponent.  The 8 point perch is special, in that it is made up of two perches.  If a single player controls both of the perches, he gains an additional 3 points (for a total of 19).  The game ends when each player has played through their deck.  Player tally their scores, and gain points for perches they control with birds. However, a perch controlled with a jaguar does not gain the player points.  The player with the most points wins the round.

External links 
 Boardgamegeek Pecking Order page at Boardgamegeek.com

Card games introduced in 2006
Dedicated deck card games
Richard Garfield games